Fritz Chapel is a historic religious structure located northwest of Bellevue, Iowa, United States.  The small roadside chapel was built by Mathias Fritz (1819-1889) in 1852.  Fritz immigrated with his family to the United States from Luxembourg that same year.  He built this chapel as an act of thanksgiving for the safe journey.  The roughly  structure has limestone walls on three sides and is open on the front.  It is capped with a gable roof.  The walls inside the chapel are plastered, and it houses a small stone altar and a hand-carved crucifix.  Located on the north side of a gravel road, it is surrounded by a picket fence.  It was listed on the National Register of Historic Places in 1991.

References

Churches completed in 1852
Vernacular architecture in Iowa
Properties of religious function on the National Register of Historic Places in Iowa
National Register of Historic Places in Jackson County, Iowa
Buildings and structures in Jackson County, Iowa
1852 establishments in Iowa